Hedwig Raabe (December 3, 1844 – April 21, 1905) was a German actress.

Life
She was born in Magdeburg, and at the age of fourteen was playing in the company of the Thalia theatre, Hamburg.

In 1864, she joined the German Court theatre at St Petersburg, touring about Germany in the summer with such success that in 1868 she relinquished her Russian engagement to devote herself to starring. In 1871 she married Albert Niemann (1831–1917), the operatic tenor.

She excelled in classical roles like Marianne in Goethe's Geschwister and Franziska in Minna von Barnhelm. It was she who first brought Ibsen's plays to Berlin.

References

Attribution

1844 births
1905 deaths
Actresses from Hamburg
19th-century German actresses
German stage actresses